Haavik is a both an Estonian language and Norwegian language surname. Notable people with the surname include:

Gunvor Galtung Haavik (1912–1977), Norwegian diplomat and Soviet spy
Knut Haavik (born 1943), Norwegian journalist, writer and editor
Lise Haavik (born 1962), Danish-Norwegian singer

See also
Håvik, village in Sogn og Fjordane, Norway

Norwegian-language surnames
Estonian-language surnames